Cantharidus crenelliferus is a species of sea snail, a marine gastropod mollusk in the family Trochidae, the top snails.

Description
The height of the shell attains 10 mm. The imperforate shell has an elevated conical shape. It is reddish with red spots. The acuminate spire has a red apex. The planulate whorls with packed lirae, that are crenulate and transverse. The sutures are obliquely striate.  The body whorl is subangulate. The base of the shell is slightly convex. The aperture is subquadrate with a white interior. The white columella is curved and truncated at its base.

Distribution
This marine species is endemic to Australia; it occurs off Queensland.

References

 Hedley, C. 1908. Studies on Australian Mollusca. Part 10. Proceedings of the Linnean Society of New South Wales 33: 456–489
 Wilson, B., 1993. Australian Marine Shells. Prosobranch Gastropods Pt I. Odyssey Publishing, Leederville, W.A.

crenelliferus
Gastropods of Australia
Gastropods described in 1851